St. Xavier College, Maharo is a Catholic college located in Dumka, Jarkhand, India. Its first academic session was in July 2011. It is run by members of the Dumka-Raiganj Province of the Society of Jesus (Jesuits). It is a self-financed minority college that aims to provide education to marginalized people in the area. The college offers B.A (English, History, Economics, Political Science and Hindi), B.Com and B. Sc. (Botany, Chemistry, Physics and Zoology) degree courses, as well as professional degree courses like BBA and BCA.

History

St. Xavier College, Maharo is managed and administered by the members of Dumka-Raiganj Province of the Society of Jesus (Jesuits). The Society of Jesus is a christian religious order founded by St. Ignatius of Loyola in 1540, has been active in the field of education throughout the world since its origin. It administers and runs over 350 high schools, 45 university colleges, 27 technical institutes and 8 business management institutes in India, with the assistance of over 13000 lay staff, educating about 4,50,000 young people belonging to every class, community and linguistic group through the medium of English and regional languages.

Courses
The college is affiliated to Sido Kanhu Murmu University (SKMU), Maharo, Dumka. It is a self-financed minority college which has been imparting significant service in the fields of education to the marginalized humanity of the area. The college began its first academic session in July 2011. The college offers Degree courses namely B.A (English, History, Economics, Political Science, Geography and Hindi) B.Com and B. Sc. Chemistry, ( Mathematics, Physics and Zoology) Professional Courses like BBA and BCA. The college is committed to its mission of producing men and women of both academic and human excellence.

References

Colleges affiliated to Sido Kanhu Murmu University
Jesuit universities and colleges in India
Universities and colleges in Jharkhand
Dumka district
Educational institutions established in 2011
2011 establishments in Jharkhand